Events from the year 1663 in England.

Incumbents
 Monarch – Charles II
 Parliament – Cavalier

Events
 10 January – the Royal African Company is granted a Royal Charter.
 February – Parliament pressures King Charles into withdrawing a proposed Declaration of Indulgence.
 24 March – the colony of Province of Carolina is established in North America.
 27 March – the gold guinea coin worth one pound sterling (introduced 6 February) is proclaimed legal tender.
 7 May – opening of the Theatre Royal, Drury Lane in London.
 8 July – King Charles grants a Royal Charter to the North American Colony of Rhode Island and Providence Plantations.
 27 July – Parliament passes the second Navigation Act, requiring all goods bound for the American colonies to be sent in English ships from English ports.
 21 August – concerned about the wintry weather, Parliament holds an intercessory fast.
 28 August – severe frost.
 31 August – Gilbert Sheldon enthroned as Archbishop of Canterbury.
 October – The Farnley Wood Plot to overthrow the monarchy.

Undated
 Roger L'Estrange appointed Surveyor of the Imprimery and Printing Presses and licenser of the press.

Births
 25 February – Pierre Antoine Motteux, translator and dramatist (died 1718)
 6 March – Francis Atterbury, bishop and man of letters (died 1732)
 17 May – Sir William Glynne, 2nd Baronet, Member of Parliament (died 1721)
 12 July – James Stuart, Duke of Cambridge, son of King James II (died 1667)
 28 September – Henry FitzRoy, 1st Duke of Grafton, illegitimate son of King Charles II, military commander (died of wounds 1690)
 John Berkeley, 3rd Baron Berkeley of Stratton, admiral (died 1697)
 William Bowyer, printer (died 1737)
 Thomas Emlyn, clergyman (died 1741)
 William King, poet (died 1712)
 George Stepney, poet and diplomat (died 1707)

Deaths
 6 January – George Goring, 1st Earl of Norwich, soldier (born 1585)
 29 January – Robert Sanderson, Bishop of Lincoln (born 1587)
 April – George Fane, Member of Parliament (born c. 1616)
 2 April – Henry Cary, 4th Viscount Falkland, Member of Parliament (born 1634)
 4 June – William Juxon, Archbishop of Canterbury (born 1582)
 25 June – John Bramhall, Archbishop (born 1594)
 5 July – Samuel Newman, clergy (born 1602)
 26 August – Sir John Yonge, 1st Baronet, Member of Parliament (born 1603)
 Edward Burrough, Quaker (born 1634)
 Cheney Culpeper, alchemist (born 1601)
 Balthazar Gerbier, artist (born 1592, Netherlands)

References

 
Years of the 17th century in England